The arrondissement of Saint-Gaudens is an arrondissement of France in the Haute-Garonne department in the Occitanie region. It has 235 communes.

Composition

The communes of the arrondissement of Saint-Gaudens, and their INSEE codes, are:

 Agassac (31001)
 Alan (31005)
 Ambax (31007)
 Anan (31008)
 Antichan-de-Frontignes (31009)
 Antignac (31010)
 Arbas (31011)
 Arbon (31012)
 Ardiège (31013)
 Arguenos (31014)
 Argut-Dessous (31015)
 Arlos (31017)
 Arnaud-Guilhem (31018)
 Artigue (31019)
 Aspet (31020)
 Aspret-Sarrat (31021)
 Aulon (31023)
 Aurignac (31028)
 Ausseing (31030)
 Ausson (31031)
 Auzas (31034)
 Bachas (31039)
 Bachos (31040)
 Bagiry (31041)
 Bagnères-de-Luchon (31042)
 Balesta (31043)
 Barbazan (31045)
 Baren (31046)
 Beauchalot (31050)
 Belbèze-en-Comminges (31059)
 Benque (31063)
 Benque-Dessous-et-Dessus (31064)
 Bezins-Garraux (31067)
 Billière (31068)
 Binos (31590)
 Blajan (31070)
 Boissède (31072)
 Bordes-de-Rivière (31076)
 Boudrac (31078)
 Boulogne-sur-Gesse (31080)
 Bourg-d'Oueil (31081)
 Boussan (31083)
 Boutx (31085)
 Bouzin (31086)
 Burgalays (31092)
 Cabanac-Cazaux (31095)
 Cardeilhac (31108)
 Cassagnabère-Tournas (31109)
 Cassagne (31110)
 Castagnède (31112)
 Castelbiague (31114)
 Castelgaillard (31115)
 Castéra-Vignoles (31121)
 Castillon-de-Larboust (31123)
 Castillon-de-Saint-Martory (31124)
 Cathervielle (31125)
 Caubous (31127)
 Cazac (31593)
 Cazarilh-Laspènes (31129)
 Cazaril-Tambourès (31130)
 Cazaunous (31131)
 Cazaux-Layrisse (31132)
 Cazeaux-de-Larboust (31133)
 Cazeneuve-Montaut (31134)
 Charlas (31138)
 Chaum (31139)
 Chein-Dessus (31140)
 Ciadoux (31141)
 Cier-de-Luchon (31142)
 Cier-de-Rivière (31143)
 Cierp-Gaud (31144)
 Cirès (31146)
 Clarac (31147)
 Coueilles (31152)
 Couret (31155)
 Cuguron (31158)
 Le Cuing (31159)
 Encausse-les-Thermes (31167)
 Eoux (31168)
 Escanecrabe (31170)
 Escoulis (31591)
 Esparron (31172)
 Estadens (31174)
 Estancarbon (31175)
 Esténos (31176)
 Eup (31177)
 Fabas (31178)
 Figarol (31183)
 Fos (31190)
 Fougaron (31191)
 Francazal (31195)
 Franquevielle (31197)
 Le Fréchet (31198)
 Fronsac (31199)
 Frontignan-de-Comminges (31200)
 Frontignan-Savès (31201)
 Galié (31207)
 Ganties (31208)
 Garin (31213)
 Génos (31217)
 Gensac-de-Boulogne (31218)
 Gouaux-de-Larboust (31221)
 Gouaux-de-Luchon (31222)
 Goudex (31223)
 Gourdan-Polignan (31224)
 Guran (31235)
 Herran (31236)
 His (31237)
 Huos (31238)
 L'Isle-en-Dodon (31239)
 Izaut-de-l'Hôtel (31241)
 Jurvielle (31242)
 Juzet-d'Izaut (31245)
 Juzet-de-Luchon (31244)
 Labarthe-Inard (31246)
 Labarthe-Rivière (31247)
 Labastide-Paumès (31251)
 Labroquère (31255)
 Laffite-Toupière (31260)
 Lalouret-Laffiteau (31268)
 Landorthe (31270)
 Larcan (31274)
 Larroque (31276)
 Latoue (31278)
 Lécussan (31289)
 Lège (31290)
 Lespiteau (31294)
 Lespugue (31295)
 Lestelle-de-Saint-Martory (31296)
 Lieoux (31300)
 Lilhac (31301)
 Lodes (31302)
 Loudet (31305)
 Lourde (31306)
 Luscan (31308)
 Malvezie (31313)
 Mancioux (31314)
 Mane (31315)
 Marignac (31316)
 Marsoulas (31321)
 Martisserre (31322)
 Martres-de-Rivière (31323)
 Mauvezin (31333)
 Mayrègne (31335)
 Mazères-sur-Salat (31336)
 Melles (31337)
 Milhas (31342)
 Mirambeau (31343)
 Miramont-de-Comminges (31344)
 Molas (31347)
 Moncaup (31348)
 Mondilhan (31350)
 Mont-de-Galié (31369)
 Montastruc-de-Salies (31357)
 Montauban-de-Luchon (31360)
 Montbernard (31363)
 Montespan (31372)
 Montesquieu-Guittaut (31373)
 Montgaillard-de-Salies (31376)
 Montgaillard-sur-Save (31378)
 Montmaurin (31385)
 Montoulieu-Saint-Bernard (31386)
 Montréjeau (31390)
 Montsaunès (31391)
 Moustajon (31394)
 Nénigan (31397)
 Nizan-Gesse (31398)
 Oô (31404)
 Ore (31405)
 Payssous (31408)
 Péguilhan (31412)
 Peyrissas (31414)
 Peyrouzet (31415)
 Pointis-de-Rivière (31426)
 Pointis-Inard (31427)
 Ponlat-Taillebourg (31430)
 Portet-d'Aspet (31431)
 Portet-de-Luchon (31432)
 Poubeau (31434)
 Proupiary (31440)
 Puymaurin (31443)
 Razecueillé (31447)
 Régades (31449)
 Rieucazé (31452)
 Riolas (31456)
 Roquefort-sur-Garonne (31457)
 Rouède (31461)
 Saccourvielle (31465)
 Saint-André (31468)
 Saint-Aventin (31470)
 Saint-Béat-Lez (31471)
 Saint-Bertrand-de-Comminges (31472)
 Saint-Élix-Séglan (31477)
 Saint-Ferréol-de-Comminges (31479)
 Saint-Frajou (31482)
 Saint-Gaudens (31483)
 Saint-Ignan (31487)
 Saint-Lary-Boujean (31493)
 Saint-Laurent (31494)
 Saint-Loup-en-Comminges (31498)
 Saint-Mamet (31500)
 Saint-Marcet (31502)
 Saint-Martory (31503)
 Saint-Médard (31504)
 Saint-Paul-d'Oueil (31508)
 Saint-Pé-d'Ardet (31509)
 Saint-Pé-Delbosc (31510)
 Saint-Plancard (31513)
 Saleich (31521)
 Salerm (31522)
 Salies-du-Salat (31523)
 Salles-et-Pratviel (31524)
 Saman (31528)
 Samouillan (31529)
 Sarrecave (31531)
 Sarremezan (31532)
 Sauveterre-de-Comminges (31535)
 Saux-et-Pomarède (31536)
 Savarthès (31537)
 Sédeilhac (31539)
 Seilhan (31542)
 Sengouagnet (31544)
 Sepx (31545)
 Signac (31548)
 Sode (31549)
 Soueich (31550)
 Terrebasse (31552)
 Touille (31554)
 Les Tourreilles (31556)
 Trébons-de-Luchon (31559)
 Urau (31562)
 Valcabrère (31564)
 Valentine (31565)
 Villeneuve-de-Rivière (31585)
 Villeneuve-Lécussan (31586)

History

The arrondissement of Saint-Gaudens was created in 1800.

As a result of the reorganisation of the cantons of France which came into effect in 2015, the borders of the cantons are no longer related to the borders of the arrondissements. The cantons of the arrondissement of Saint-Gaudens were, as of January 2015:

 Aspet
 Aurignac
 Bagnères-de-Luchon
 Barbazan
 Boulogne-sur-Gesse
 L'Isle-en-Dodon
 Montréjeau
 Saint-Béat
 Saint-Gaudens
 Saint-Martory
 Salies-du-Salat

References

Saint-Gaudens